Cadbury Heath is a residential area in South Gloucestershire, England, located east of Bristol.

References

Villages in South Gloucestershire District